Badger Grove is an unincorporated community in Prairie Township, White County, in the U.S. state of Indiana.

History
A post office called Badger was established in 1881, and remained in operation until 1900. Badgers which lived in a nearby grove caused the name to be selected.

Geography

References

Unincorporated communities in White County, Indiana
Unincorporated communities in Indiana